The Guanella Pass Scenic Byway is a National Forest Scenic Byway and Colorado Scenic and Historic Byway located in Clear Creek and Park counties, Colorado, USA. The byway traverses Guanella Pass at elevation  in Arapaho and Pike national forests. The pass lies above timberline surrounded by Grays Peak at elevation , Torreys Peak , Mount Evans , and Mount Bierstadt . The byway passes through the Georgetown–Silver Plume Historic District, and provides access to the Georgetown Loop Historic Mining & Railroad Park and the Georgetown Loop Railroad. The byway is renowned for its spectacular autumn colors during aspen color change from September 10 through October 10 each year.

Route

Gallery

See also

History Colorado
List of scenic byways in Colorado
Scenic byways in the United States

Notes

References

External links

America's Scenic Byways: Colorado
Colorado Department of Transportation
Colorado Scenic & Historic Byways Commission
Colorado Scenic & Historic Byways
Colorado Travel Map
Colorado Tourism Office
History Colorado
National Forest Scenic Byways

Colorado Scenic and Historic Byways
National Forest Scenic Byways
National Forest Scenic Byways in Colorado
Arapaho National Forest
Pike National Forest
Transportation in Colorado
Transportation in Clear Creek County, Colorado
Transportation in Park County, Colorado
Tourist attractions in Colorado
Tourist attractions in Clear Creek County, Colorado
Tourist attractions in Park County, Colorado
Interstate 70
U.S. Route 285